Ritual Coffee Roasters is a coffee roaster based in San Francisco, California, with six cafes in San Francisco and Napa. Founded in 2005, Ritual Roasters is considered part of the "third wave of coffee" independent companies which both roast their own beans, wholesale, and operate cafes. Their peers include Blue Bottle Coffee Company and Four Barrel Coffee, among others. In March 2017, Somatik partnered with Ritual Coffee to make $12 marijuana-infused cold brew.

See also
 List of coffeehouse chains

References

External links
 
 Ritual Coffee Roasters on sfwiki.org

Food and drink companies based in San Francisco
Coffeehouses and cafés in the United States
Drink companies based in California
Food and drink companies established in 2005
American companies established in 2005